Jaap Drupsteen  (born 1942 in Hasselt (Overijssel)) is a Dutch graphic designer.

Drupsteen worked as a graphic designer for NOS and VPRO; he specialized in making leaders, music videos, and other video and television productions.

His best known work are his designs for a series of banknotes for De Nederlandsche Bank. In 1999, Drupsteen was assigned by the Dutch government to design a new passport. He also designed several stamps for PTT. Recently, he designed the exterior of the Netherlands Institute for Sound and Vision in Hilversum.

List of banknotes

Prizes 
 Nipkow Schijf (1976)
 Werkman Design Award (1980)
 Sikkens Award (1981)
 Prix Italia (1987)
 L.J. Jordaan Award for banknotes documentary (1988)
 Alblas Award en Holland Video Award (1990)

Citations

External links 
 Studio Drupsteen (Mostly Dutch, some English)
 

1942 births
Living people
People from Zwartewaterland
Dutch graphic designers
Dutch currency designers